Moncouche may refer to:

Lac-Moncouche, Quebec, an unorganized territory in Lac-Saint-Jean-Est Regional County Municipality, Saguenay–Lac-Saint-Jean, Quebec, Canada
Moncouche Lake (Mont-Valin), Mont-Valin, Le Fjord-du-Saguenay Regional County Municipality, Saguenay–Lac-Saint-Jean, Quebec, Canada
Moncouche Lake (Lac-Saint-Jean-Est), Lac-Moncouche, Lac-Saint-Jean-Est Regional County Municipality, Saguenay–Lac-Saint-Jean, Quebec, Canada
Moncouche River, a tributary of Métabetchouane River in Lac-Jacques-Cartier, Quebec, Canada

See also
Monocouche renders, a type of decorative finish applied to the outside of buildings to provide both decoration and weather protection
Simoncouche River, Saguenay, Saguenay–Lac-Saint-Jean, Quebec, Canada